Louis Alfred Becquerel (3 June 1814 – 10 March 1862) was a French physician and medical researcher.

Becquerel was born in Paris. He was the oldest son of Antoine César Becquerel, and brother of Alexandre Edmond Becquerel. In 1840 he obtained his doctorate with the thesis "Recherches cliniques sur les affections tuberculeuses du cerveau", and in 1847 attained the title of professeur agrégé.

Becquerel died in Paris.

Selected works
Recherches cliniques sur la méningite des enfants, 1838.
Recherches cliniques sur les affections tuberculeuses du cerveau, 1840.
Traité du bégayement et des moyens de le guérir, 1844.
De l'empirisme en médecine, 1844.
La Séméiotique des urines, ou Traité des signes fournis par les urines dans les maladies, 1845.
Traité clinique des maladies de l'utérus, 1859.
Des applications de l'électricité à la thérapeutique médicale, 1853, 2nd edition 1860.
Traité élémentaire d'hygiène privée et publique, Paris, Asselin, 1854, 4th edition 1868.

References 
 Becquerel, Alfred (1814-1862) IDREF.fr / bibliography

1814 births
1862 deaths
Scientists from Paris
19th-century French physicians